Leonardo Cimino (November 4, 1917 – March 3, 2012) was an American film, television and stage actor who in 1937 appeared in the original stage production of Marc Blitzstein's The Cradle Will Rock. Cimino's most well known roles are in the 1983 science fiction miniseries, V as Abraham Bernstein and the 1987 feature film The Monster Squad as the "Scary German guy".

Life and career
Born in Manhattan, Cimino was the son of Andrea and Leonilda Cimino. His father was a tailor. Cimino was initially interested in pursuing a career as a violinist, and studied the instrument at the Juilliard School when he was a teenager. While studying the violin he became interested in acting and dancing, and began studying those as well. In 1936, at the age of 18, he made his professional stage debut in a supporting role in the world premiere of Gladys Bronwyn Stern's Middle Man in Suffern, New York which starred actor Ernest Truex. It was not until a decade later, however, that Cimino would become dedicated full-time to an acting career. During the late 1930s and early 1940s he studied acting, directing and modern dance at the Neighborhood Playhouse School of the Theatre.

After the outbreak of World War II, Cimino joined the United States Army in 1942. He notably participated in the invasion of Normandy, landing with the second wave on June 6, 1944.

After returning to the United States in 1945 he continued to study the performing arts at the Neighborhood Playhouse; notably studying dance with Martha Graham. In 1946 he made his Broadway debut in a revival of Cyrano de Bergerac which starred and was directed by José Ferrer. It was the first of many projects that Cimino would collaborate with Ferrer on. He went on to appear in nearly 20 Broadway productions over the next four decades, including a 1962 adaptation of E. M. Forster’s Passage to India and a 1985 revival of The Iceman Cometh. In 1976 he was nominated for a Drama Desk Award for his performance of the role of Jim in Arthur Miller's A Memory of Two Mondays.

Cimino also appeared in numerous Off-Broadway productions during his career, notably winning an Obie Award in 1958 for his portrayal of Smerdyakov in The Brothers Karamazov. He frequently appeared Off-Broadway in Shakespeare plays at the Public Theater, including Egeon in The Comedy of Errors (1975) alongside Ted Danson and Danny DeVito. He also appeared in productions in Regional theatres across the United States during his career. In 1970 he was awarded the Joseph Jefferson Award for Best Actor in a Principal Role for his performance in The Man in the Glass Booth at the Goodman Theatre in Chicago, Illinois.

Cimino made many guest appearances on TV shows, including  Naked City, Kojak, The Equalizer and Law & Order.  In 1981 and 1982, he played Alexei Vartova on ABC's soap opera Ryan's Hope.

Cimino died on March 3, 2012, of chronic obstructive pulmonary disease at his home in Woodstock, New York.

Filmography

Film

Television

References

External links
 
 
 

American male film actors
American male stage actors
American male television actors
United States Army personnel of World War II
Juilliard School alumni
Obie Award recipients
Male actors from New York City
United States Army soldiers
1917 births
2012 deaths
Deaths from emphysema